Double Shoals Cotton Mill is a historic post-Civil War textile mill located at Cleveland County, North Carolina. It is a 2 1/2-story, brick building with a shallow-pitched, side-gable-roof and Italianate style design elements. Also on the property are a contributing mill race and dam, built about 1880.

History
Thomas R. Jackson deeded 268 acres to Albert A. Homsley. Homsley eventually built a mill building in 1855 that became the precursor to the Double Shoals Mill. The building and land changed hands in 1867 and again in 1874 when it was sold to E. A. Morgan, with additions made in 1965 and in the 1970s. He named the mill Double Shoals Mill Company. Other names for the mill were the Double Shoals Manufacturing Company and Lucky Strike Yarn Mill, north of Shelby, North Carolina. The Morgan family continued to run the mill until 1919. Throughout the 1900’s, the mill changed owners several times until it ceased all manufacturing in the 1980’s. Throughout the years of operation, the manufacturing products included: cloth, cotton yarn, twine, other types of yarn, rugs, and car seat covering material.

Present
The building is currently under renovations for use as an indoor and outdoor event venue, an auto restoration shop, and art classes are also held there.. It was listed on the National Register of Historic Places in 2009.

In 2016 work began to transform the once abandoned mill into something special. The first action was to convert the lower level for use as a custom car shop, Fabbit Customs. Then the outdoor spaces began taking space for use as event space. Now the upper level is being converted into space for an art studio and event space.

Gallery

References

Industrial buildings and structures on the National Register of Historic Places in North Carolina
Italianate architecture in North Carolina
Industrial buildings completed in 1880
Buildings and structures in Cleveland County, North Carolina
National Register of Historic Places in Cleveland County, North Carolina
1880 establishments in North Carolina
Textile machinery manufacturers
History of the textile industry
Textile mills in the United States
Industrial archaeological sites in the United States